PAHS may refer to:
 Polycyclic aromatic hydrocarbons (PAHs)

Schools 
 Patan Academy of Health Sciences, Patan, Lalitpur, Nepal
 Perth Amboy High School, Perth Amboy, New Jersey, United States
 Pipestone Area High School, Pipestone, Minnesota, United States
 Pottsville Area High School, Pottsville, Pennsylvania, United States
 Princess Anne High School, Virginia Beach, Virginia, United States
Plano Academy High School, Plano, Texas, United States
Phoenixville Area High School, Phoenixville, Pennsylvania, United States

See also 
 PAH (disambiguation)